Miguel Ángel Arrué Padilla (born 13 August 1952) is a Chilean football manager and former footballer.

Career
Born in Iquique, as a football player, he played in Chile and abroad for three years.

He has had a prolific career as a football manager in Chile, Peru, Ecuador, Indonesia and Mexico. Despite he is Chilean, in Chile he just has coached Deportes Antofagasta, Deportes Iquique, Everton and Santiago Morning.

His first team abroad was Juventud La Palma in the Peruvian Segunda División to which he came in 1988. In Peru he also coached Hijos de Yurimaguas (later Deportivo Yurimaguas), Sport Boys, Alianza Lima, Deportivo Sipesa, Sporting Cristal, Melgar, Pacífico and Pirata FC, what was his last club.

Along with Hijos de Yurimaguas, he won the 1990 Peruvian Segunda División. In Deportivo Sipesa, he allowed the professional debut of Claudio Pizarro. He is a well remembered coach of Alianza Lima after coached it four times, even suggesting the signing of Ramón Estay as manager, with whom he had worked in Deportes Iquique as an assistant.

In Peru he also worked as General Manager of both the Alianza Lima youth system and club Ingenia Fútbol in the Primera División of Chiclayo.

In Ecuador he coached Deportivo Quito. He also coached a Indonesia youth team until 2010.

Personal life
In Peru he has been honored as Hijo Ilustre (Illustrious Son) of two cities and a football field in Huacho was given his name. 

He is the father of both Franco Arrué, a Chilean football referee and Claudio Arrué, a fitness coach who has worked along with him.

Honours
Hijos de Yurimaguas
 Peruvian Segunda División: 1990

Manzanillo
 Liga TDP: 2006 Clausura

References

External links
 
 Miguel Ángel Arrué at CeroaCero 

1952 births
Living people
People from Iquique
Chilean footballers
Chilean expatriate footballers
Chilean football managers
Chilean expatriate football managers
Deportes Antofagasta managers
Deportes Iquique managers
Sport Boys managers
Club Alianza Lima managers
S.D. Quito managers
Sporting Cristal managers
FBC Melgar managers
Santiago Morning managers
Primera B de Chile managers
Chilean Primera División managers
Chilean expatriate sportspeople in Peru
Chilean expatriate sportspeople in Ecuador
Chilean expatriate sportspeople in Indonesia
Chilean expatriate sportspeople in Mexico
Expatriate football managers in Peru
Expatriate football managers in Ecuador
Expatriate football managers in Indonesia
Expatriate football managers in Mexico